Cornelius Middelthon (12 April 1869 – 6 April 1934) was a Norwegian grocer and politician of the Conservative Party who served as Minister of Labour from 1920 to 1921 and again from 1923 to 1924.

1869 births
1934 deaths
Government ministers of Norway